Ahmed Kamel Aly (born 27 February 1925) is an Egyptian former diver. He competed at the 1952 Summer Olympics.

References

External links
 

Egyptian male divers
Olympic divers of Egypt
Divers at the 1952 Summer Olympics
1925 births
Possibly living people